Galaxy classification is classification by means of and for the discipline of astronomy.

 galaxy morphological classification
 galaxy AGN classification (galaxy active galactic nucleus classification)